Anopheles barbirostris is a species complex of mosquito belonging to the genus Anopheles. Larvae found in clean, lotic bodies of water. Females are zoophilic, mainly feed blood on cattle and humans. It is also an important vector for Plasmodium falciparum in Sri Lanka and Timor, for both Plasmodium vivax and P. falciparum in Bangladesh.

References

External links
Molecular characterization of the malaria vector Anopheles barbirostris van der Wulp in Sri Lanka
Anopheles barbirostris/campestris as a probable vector of malaria in Aranyaprathet, Sa Kaeo Province.
A molecular phylogeny of mosquitoes in the Anopheles barbirostris Subgroup reveals cryptic species: Implications for identification of disease vectors
Systematics of the Anopheles barbirostris species complex (Diptera: Culicidae: Anophelinae) in Thailand

barbirostris
Insects described in 1884